The Smart For-Us (stylised as "smart for-us") is a 2012 concept car. It is classed as a pick-up vehicle, because its back is a lot like how a Pickup truck looks. The only difference is that it is a convertible. The headlights have rims around them, which are indicators, and the tail lights can open and become an extra storage space.

The interior features 2 seats, and the seats are meant to have a "Hammock-Like" feel. It is an automatic, with the brake pedal in the shape of a rectangle, and the acceleration pedal in the shape of a circle. It has a smartphone at the top of the windscreen, which replaces a rear view mirror. It shows footage of the back of the car. There 3 circles by the u-shaped steering wheel. One is a Speedometer, and there are two others.

References 

For-Us
Cars introduced in 2012
Concept cars
Electric cars